Anne Rogers (born 29 July 1933) is an English actress, dancer, and singer.

Career
Anne Rogers was born in Liverpool and began her stage career at the age of 15. She was in the original London production of The Boy Friend, playing the female lead of Polly Browne for nearly four years.

She was unable to play in the Broadway production of The Boy Friend because of London commitments, but later went to the U.S. to play Eliza Doolittle in the Hollywood and Chicago productions of My Fair Lady, winning the Sarah Siddons Award for her performance.  After two years, she returned to London to play the same role for three years at the Theatre Royal (Drury Lane). She appeared on Broadway in  "Half a Sixpence" and "42nd Street."  When she played Jessie Matthews in the 2000 West End production of "Over My Shoulder," the Telegraph welcomed her back as a "marvelous old trouper."
She played Gladys in the gala New York performance of the musical Busker Alley in 2005, starring alongside Jim Dale, Glenn Close and George S. Irving.

Stage shows
 The Boy Friend
 My Fair Lady
 She Loves Me
 I Do! I Do!
 No No Nanette
 Half a Sixpence
 Zenda

 42nd Street
 Gigi
 Camelot
 A Streetcar Named Desire (in South Africa)
 Over My Shoulder (as Jessie Matthews)
Busker Alley.
 The Drowsy Chaperone

TV appearances
 Elizabeth, The Queen
 Rock and Roll Mom
 Sparkling Cyanide
 Birds on the Wing
 Song of Songs
 Hogan's Heroes
 Doctors (BBC 2008)'
 MacGyver (Season 2 – Three for the Road)

Awards

Reference list
Notes

Bibliography

External links
 
 

1933 births
Living people
English female dancers
English women singers
English musical theatre actresses
English television actresses
Actresses from Liverpool